Šernas is a Lithuanian language family name. It may refer to:
Justas Šernas
Jokūbas Šernas
Tomas Šernas
Juozas Adomaitis-Šernas
Jacques Sernas,  Lithuanian-born French actor

See also
Serna

Lithuanian-language surnames